FAAP (Armando Alvares Penteado Foundation) was founded in 1947 by Earl Armando Alvares Penteado, whose objective was to support, promote and develop the plastic and scenic arts, culture and teaching.

It is one of the most prestigious and respected academic institutions in Brazil, with twelve thousand students and twelve hundred professors. The Campus is located in Higienópolis, one of the most traditional districts of São Paulo, and houses seven faculties: Business Administration, Fine Arts, Communication, Engineering, Economics, Law and Technology, post-graduation courses and MBA.

The foundation is an important cultural centre in São Paulo, housing one of the most eminent theaters in town (Teatro FAAP) and the Museu de Arte Brasileira (Museum of Brazilian Art). FAAP has received important exhibits, most notably the exhibit "China: A Arte Imperial, A Arte do Cotidiano, A Arte Contemporânea", the "Treasures of the Czars" display (including some of the famous Fabergé eggs), and in 2011 an exhibit on Grace Kelly, "Os Anos Grace Kelly" (Grace Kelly Era), inaugurated by Prince Albert of Monaco.

Every semester the institution provides lectures from notable artists, politicians and economists. Notable guest speakers include George H. W. Bush, Bill Clinton, Gordon Brown, Queen Silvia of Sweden, Rubens Ricupero (also Director Faculty of Economics), Fernando Henrique Cardoso, Peter Mandelson, among others.

Schools and faculties
 School of Arts: courses in fashion, design, architecture, cultural production, and fine arts
 School of Business: business administration
 School of Communications: 2D/3D animation, advertising, film studies, public relations, radio & TV and journalism
 School of Computing and Information Technology: information systems, computer science
 School of Economics: economics and international relations
 School of Engineering: chemical engineering, civil engineering, electrical engineering, mechanical engineering, production engineering
 School of Law: law
 High School

Notable alumni
 João Dória
 Sergio Herz
 Alexandre Gama
 Denise Pavarina
 Carlos Tramontina
 Marco Luque
 Serginho Groisman
 Cláudia Pacheco
 Mario Marchetti
 Vik Muniz
 Antonio Carlos Pannunzio
 Ricardo Hirschbruch
 Lais Bodanzky
 Laerte Coutinho
 Bruna Lombardi
 José Leonilson
 Alexandre da Cunha

External links
 Official website

Educational institutions established in 1947
Private universities and colleges in Brazil
Universities and colleges in São Paulo (state)
1947 establishments in Brazil
Universities and colleges in São Paulo